The 99th Division was formed in February 1949 from 2nd Regiment of 7th Division, 18th Regiment of 11th Division of PLA Bohai column of Huadong Field Army and defected Republic of China Army 538th Regiment of 180th Division. Under the command of 33rd Corps it took part in the Chinese civil war. The division was then composed of:
295th Regiment;
296th Regiment;
297th Regiment.

After the Shanghai Campaign the division stationed in Baoshan, Shanghai. In November 1950 the division was re-organized and renamed as 16th Public Security Division() while detaching from the Corps. By then the division was composed of:
46th Public Security Regiment;
47th Public Security Regiment;
48th Public Security Regiment.

In February 1953 the division moved to Haimen, Zhejiang for coastal defense mission.

In July 1955 the division moved to Dachen Islands. 46th Public Security Regiment was detached.

In January 1957 the division was reduced to 16th Garrison Brigade(). 47th Public Security Regiment was detached. 48th Public Security Regiment was renamed as Dachen Islands Garrison Regiment. The brigade was composed of 48th Regiment and 4 artillery battalions.

In January 1958 the brigade was inactivated and became Taizhou Military Sub-district. 

In January 1959 16th Garrison Division() was activated from the military sub-district. The division soon expanded to 3 garrison regiments (81st, 82nd and 83rd) and moved to Linhai, Zhejiang province.

In December 1964 the division was inactivated and became Taizhou Military Sub-district again.

References
中国人民解放军各步兵师沿革，http://blog.sina.com.cn/s/blog_a3f74a990101cp1q.html
解放军公安军的18个公安师，https://web.archive.org/web/20171011072616/http://www.360doc.com/content/15/0726/10/10496043_487469859.shtml
中国人民解放军原公安第十六师, http://club.xilu.com/zgjsyj/msgview-819697-85218.html

G16
Military units and formations established in 1949
Military units and formations disestablished in 1964